Epichloë canadensis is a hybrid asexual species in the fungal genus Epichloë. 

A systemic and seed-transmissible grass symbiont first described in 2012,  Epichloë canadensis is a natural allopolyploid of Epichloë amarillans and Epichloë elymi.

Epichloë canadensis is found in North America, where it has been identified in the grass species Elymus canadensis.

References 

canadensis
Fungi described in 2012
Fungi of North America